Dr Keith Vincent Smith is an Australian writer, historian and journalist. He has become a notable specialist on early Sydney and indigenous Australians of the Sydney area, including the lives of the Eora peoples, Bungaree, and Bennelong.

Early life
Keith Vincent Smith was born in Ku-ring-gai territory near the lagoon at Dee Why, north of Sydney. He grew up on Dee Why Headland within sight of the Barranjoey Lighthouse at the edge of Broken Bay.

Journalism
As a journalist, Keith Smith worked on the Sydney Morning Herald and The Australian and was a correspondent for Australian Associated Press in London, Saigon and Sydney. He was a correspondent covering the Vietnam War.

Interest in pre-invasion Sydney
As a mature student, studying progressively for first, masters, and doctorate degrees at Macquarie University, Smith developed a strong interest in early colonial Sydney and the inhabitants of the area before British colonisation.

Publications
As author:

Sydney City, Smith's Guides, (1988)

King Bungaree: A Sydney Aborigine meets the great South Pacific Explorers, 1799–1830, Kangaroo Press, (1992)

Bennelong: The coming in of the Eora, Sydney Cove 1788–1792, Kangaroo Press/Simon & Schuster, (2001)

Wallumedegal: An Aboriginal history of Ryde, City of Ryde, (2005)

MARI NAWI: Aboriginal Odysseys, Rosenberg, (2010)

As contributor:

Governor Phillip and a man named Bennelong, Australian Heritage, Volume 1, (2005)

Bennelong, Ambassador of the Eora, Australian Heritage, Volume 2, (2006)

Bennelong among his people, Aboriginal History, Vol. 33, ANU Press, (2009)

The many faces of Bungaree, in Bungaree The First Australian, Mosman Art Gallery, (2013)

15 biographical entries at The Dictionary of Sydney, including on Bennelong and Pemulwuy

TV series
As senior researcher:

Episode 1, First Australians, Blackfella Films, dir. Rachel Perkins, originally broadcast on SBS in 2009.

References

Living people
Year of birth missing (living people)
Writers from Sydney